Conopodium is a genus of flowering plants belonging to the family Apiaceae.

Its native range is north-western Europe and the Mediterranean.

Species
The following species are recognised in the genus Conopodium:

Conopodium arvense 
Conopodium bunioides 
Conopodium glaberrimum 
Conopodium majus 
Conopodium marianum 
Conopodium pyrenaeum 
Conopodium subcarneum 
Conopodium thalictrifolium

References

Apioideae